Recurvaria thomeriella is a moth of the family Gelechiidae. It is found in southern France and Spain.

The larvae feed on Prunus spinosa.

References

Moths described in 1901
Recurvaria
Moths of Europe